The "Get a Mac" campaign is a television advertising campaign created for Apple Inc. (Apple Computer, Inc. at the start of the campaign) by TBWA\Media Arts Lab, the company's advertising agency, that ran from 2006 to 2009. The advertising campaign ran worldwide in the United States, Canada, Australia, New Zealand, the United Kingdom, Japan, and Germany.

Synopsis
The Get a Mac advertisements follow a standard template. They open to a plain white background, and a man dressed in casual clothes introduces himself as an Apple Macintosh computer ("Hello, I'm a Mac."), while a man in a more formal suit-and-tie combination introduces himself as a Microsoft Windows personal computer ("And I'm a PC.").

The two then act out a brief vignette, in which the capabilities and attributes of Mac and PC are compared, with PC—characterized as formal and somewhat polite, though uninteresting and overly concerned with work—often being frustrated by the more laid-back Mac's abilities. The earlier commercials in the campaign involved a general comparison of the two computers, whereas the later ones mainly concerned Windows Vista and Windows 7.

The original American advertisements star actor Justin Long as the Mac, and author and humorist John Hodgman as the PC, and were directed by Phil Morrison. The American advertisements also aired on Canadian, Australian, and New Zealand television, and at least 24 of them were dubbed into Spanish, French, German, and Italian. The British campaign stars comedic duo Robert Webb as Mac and David Mitchell as PC, while the Japanese campaign features the comedic duo Rahmens. Several of the British and Japanese advertisements, although based on the originals, were slightly altered to better target the new audiences. Both the British and Japanese campaigns also feature several original ads not seen in the American campaign.

The Get a Mac campaign is the successor to the Switch ads which were first broadcast in 2002. Both campaigns were filmed against a plain white background. Apple's former CEO, Steve Jobs, introduced the campaign during a shareholder's meeting the week before the campaign started. The campaign also coincided with a change of signage and employee apparel at Apple retail stores detailing reasons to switch to Macs.

The Get a Mac campaign received the Grand Effie Award in 2007. The song in the commercial is called "Having Trouble Sneezing" by Mark Mothersbaugh.

Advertisements

The advertisements play on perceived weaknesses of non-Mac personal computers, especially those running Microsoft Windows, of which PC is clearly intended to be a parody, and corresponding strengths possessed by the Mac OS (such as immunity to circulating viruses and spyware targeted at Microsoft Windows). The target audience of these ads is not devoted PC users but rather, those who are more likely to "swing" towards Apple. Apple realizes that many consumers who choose PCs do so because of their lack of knowledge of the Apple brand. With this campaign, Apple was targeting those users who may not consider Macs when purchasing but may be persuaded to when they view these ads. Each of the ads is about 30 seconds in length and is accompanied by a song called "Having Trouble Sneezing," which was composed by Mark Mothersbaugh. The advertisements are presented below in alphabetical order, not chronological order.

North American campaign

The following is an alphabetical list of the ads that appeared in the campaign shown in the United States, Canada, Australia and New Zealand.
Accident—A PC, who is sitting in a wheelchair and wearing casts on his arms, explains that he fell off his desk when someone tripped over his power cord, thus prompting Mac to point out that the MacBook's and MacBook Pro's magnetic power cord prevents such an occurrence. The Macbook featured at the end demonstrates the feature.
Angel/Devil—Mac gives PC an iPhoto book to view. Suddenly, angel and devil versions of PC appear behind him. The angel encourages PC to compliment Mac, while the devil prods PC to destroy the book. In the end, PC says the book is good and then turns around, feeling the air where the angel and devil versions of himself were.
Bake Sale—When Mac questions PC regarding a bake sale he has set up, PC replies that he is trying to raise money by himself in order to fix Vista's problems. Mac decides to contribute by buying a cupcake, but as soon as he takes a bite, PC asks him to pay ten million dollars for it.
Bean Counter—PC is trying to balance his budget, admitting that Vista's problems are frustrating PC users and it's time to take drastic action: spending almost all of the money on advertising. When Mac asks PC if he thinks the small amount of money left will fix Vista, PC reallocates all of it to advertising. This ad coincided with the introduction of Microsoft's "I'm a PC" campaign.
Better—Mac praises PC's ability with spreadsheets but explains that he is better with life-related activities such as music, pictures, and movies. PC defensively asks what Mac means by "better," only to sheepishly claim a different definition when Mac tells him.
Better Results—PC and Mac discuss making home movies and show each other their efforts. Supermodel Gisele Bündchen enters, representing Mac's movie, while PC's movie is represented by a man with a hairy chest wearing a blonde wig and a dress similar to Bündchen's. PC states that his movie is a "work-in-progress."
Biohazard Suit—PC first appears wearing a biohazard suit to protect himself from PC viruses and malware, of which PC says there are 20,000 discovered every day. Mac asks PC if he is going to live in the suit for the rest of his life, but PC cannot hear him because he is too protected by his virus-proof mask, and takes it off. PC then shrieks and struggles to place it on again.
Boxer—PC is introduced by a ring announcer as if he were in a boxing match, stating that he's not going down without a fight. Mac explains that the issue is not a competition but, rather, people switching to a computer that's simpler and more intuitive. The announcer admits his brother-in-law recently purchased a Mac and loves it. This is also the first ad to show Mac OS X Leopard.
Breakthrough—Mac and PC's therapist (played by Corinne Bohrer, see "Counselor" below) suggest that PC's problems are simply a result of software and hardware coming from various sources, whereas Mac gets all his hardware and software from one place. PC keeps repeating "It's not my fault!" with the support of Mac and the therapist before concluding, "It's Mac's fault! It's Mac's fault!" Mac and the therapist are disappointed in PC's conclusion, but PC nevertheless ends with the comment "What a Breakthrough!"
Broken Promises—PC tells Mac how excited he is about the launch of Windows 7 and assures him it won't have the same problems as Vista. However, Mac feels like he has heard this before and has a series of flashbacks with past versions of PC assuring him about Windows Vista, XP, ME, 98, 95, and 2.0. In the last flashback, PC says, "Trust me." Back in the present, he explains this time it's going to be different and says, "Trust me," in an almost identical way to his flashback counterparts.
Calming Teas—PC announces calming teas and bath salts to make Vista's annoyances easier to live with, such as "Crashy-time Chamomile", "Missing Driver Mint", "Pomegranate Patience", and "Raspberry Restart". He runs out of time before he can talk about his bath salts.
Choose a Vista—Confused about which of the six versions of Windows Vista to get, PC spins a large game show wheel. PC lands on Lose a Turn, and Mac questions why PC put that space on the wheel.
Computer Cart—PC and three other men in suits are on a computer cart. When Mac asks why, PC says that he gets an error with a Windows Media Player Dynamic-link library file (WMP.DLL), and that the others suffer from similar errors. The man in the beige suit represents error 692, the man in the grey suit represents a Syntax error, and the man in the bottom of the cart represents a fatal system error (PC whispers, "He's a goner," at the commercial's end). Mac explains that Macs don't get cryptic error messages.
Counselor—PC and Mac visit a psychotherapist (played by Corinne Bohrer) to resolve their differences. While Mac finds it easy to compliment PC ("You are a wizard with numbers and you dress like a gentleman."), PC's resentment is too deep for him to reciprocate ("I guess you are better at creating stuff, even though it's completely juvenile and a waste of time."). The counselor suggests that they come twice a week.
Customer Care—Mac is seen with a Mac Genius from an Apple Retail Store's Genius Bar, who can fix Mac problems. PC then has a short montage of endless automated customer-support messages, never reaching a real person, much to his disappointment. PC then says that his source of help is "the same" as a Mac Genius.
Elimination—PC attempts to find Megan, a new laptop hunter, the perfect PC. He starts by eliminating from a lineup of fellow PCs all those who have too-small screens and too-slow processors. However, none of the PCs is "immune" to viruses, which is Megan's #1 concern, so PC leaves her with Mac.
Flashback—Mac asks PC if he would like to see the website and home movie that he made. This prompts PC to remember a time when both he and Mac were children: when the younger Mac asks the younger PC if he would like to see some artwork he did, the younger PC takes out a calculator and calculates the time they have just wasted (This may be a reference to the time when PC's were text-based, while Macs were slower but had GUIs). Returning from the flashback, PC does the same thing.
Genius—Mac introduces PC to one of the Mac Geniuses from the Apple Retail Store's Genius Bar. PC tests the Genius, starting with math questions, which culminates in asking her, on a scale of one to ten, how much does he loathe Mac, to which she answers "Eleven." Surprised, PC says "She's good. Very good."
Gift Exchange—Mac and PC exchange gifts for Christmas. PC, who is hoping for a C++ GUI programming guide, is disappointed to receive a photo album of previous Get a Mac ads made on iPhoto. In contrast, he gives Mac a C++ GUI programming guide.
Goodwill—Mac and PC agree to put aside their differences because of the Christmas season. Although PC momentarily slips and states that Mac wastes his time with frivolous pursuits like home movies and blogs, the two agree, as Mac says, to "Pull it into hug harbor," and they wish each other a good holiday.
Group—PC is at a support group for PCs living with Vista. The other PCs there tell him to take it one day at a time and that he is facing the biggest fact of all—that Vista isn't working as it should. They all wish the Vista problems will go away sooner and a lot easier. One of them says pleasingly that he has been error-free for a week, but he starts to repeat himself uncontrollably, discouraging the others.
iLife—PC listens to an iPod and praises iTunes. Mac replies that the rest of iLife works just as well and comes on every Mac. PC defensively responds by listing the cool apps that he comes with, but he can only identify a calculator and a clock.
I Can Do Anything—In this animated commercial designed for the holiday season, PC asks Mac why the former loves the holidays so much. Mac asks if it's the season for peace on earth, but PC replies that they get to be animated and can do anything. PC demonstrates by floating in the air, building a snowman in fast motion, and asking a hopping bunny where he is going. The bunny, who can speak, says he's going to the Apple Store for some last-minute gifts. PC then purposely tips off the snowman's head, making it fall on the bunny, and sarcastically apologizes to him, calling himself clumsy. The animation style for this ad mimics the Rankin/Bass animation style seen in a number of classic Christmas specials.
Legal Copy—Every time PC says something positive about himself, the legal copy that appears on the screen bottom increases. He finally states that PCs are now "100% trouble-free", and the legal copy covers the whole screen.
Meant for Work—PC, looking haggard and covered in stickers, complains about the children who use him and their activities, such as making movies and blogging, which are wearing him out. He also says he cries himself to sleep mode every night, complaining that, unlike Mac, he is meant more for office work. PC is then alerted because his user wants to listen to some emo music and, with a loud groan, trudges off, showing an Anarchy sticker on his back.
Misprint—PC is on the phone with PC World, attempting to report a misprint. He explains how the print said, "The fastest Windows Vista notebook we tested this year is a Mac." PC argues how impossible it is for a Mac to run Vista faster than a PC, while Mac tries to explain that it is true. While arguing with PCWorld over the phone, PC says that he'll put Mac on the line to set things straight. However, he instead impersonates Mac, saying that PCs are faster.
Network—Mac and PC are holding hands to demonstrate their ability to network with each other. A Japanese woman representing a new digital camera enters and takes Mac's free hand. While Mac and the camera are perfectly compatible and speak to each other fluently, PC—who cannot speak Japanese—is utterly confused and unable to communicate, representing that Windows PCs need a driver installation with virtually all new hardware.
Now What—PC begins by showing off his new, long book, I Want to Buy a Computer — Now What? to help customers deal with all the difficult computer-buying decisions if they have no one to help. Mac then explains that, at Apple Stores, personal shoppers help customers find the perfect Mac, even offering workshops to teach people about using the computers. Upon hearing this, PC brings out his book's companion volume, I Just Bought a Computer — Now What?
Office Stress—Mac's new Microsoft Office 2008 has just been released. In the box that PC gives Mac is a stress toy for him to use when he gets overwhelmed from doing lots more work. However, PC begins using the toy, complaining that Microsoft Office is also compatible with Mac, that he wants to switch his files over, and that he is getting less work than Mac, eventually breaking the toy.
Off the Air—Mac and PC appear with a Mac Genius, who announces it is now easier than ever to switch to a Mac and that a Mac Genius can switch over PC files to a new Mac for free. PC then protests that fear is what keeps people from switching, and people don't need to hear about the Mac Genius. In protest, he pulls a cover over the camera, which has a test card drawn on it, and declares that they are off the air.
Out of the Box—Mac (in a white box) and PC (in a brown box doing some exercises) are discussing what they will do when they are unpacked. Mac says that he can get started right away, but PC is held up by the numerous activities that he must complete before being useful. Mac eventually leaves to get right to work, but PC is forced to wait for parts that are still in other boxes.
Party is Over—PC unhappily throws a party celebrating the release of Windows Vista. He complains to Mac that he had to upgrade his hardware and now can't use some of his old software and peripherals. He then talks with one of the party members about throwing another party in five years, which turns into five years and a day, and so on.
PC Choice Chat—PC has his own radio talk show called PC Choice Chat, and people begin to call in asking for advice on which computer to get. All the callers ask for advice on a computer that would qualify as a Mac but not as a PC. One caller asks for a computer for people who hate getting viruses, another caller asks for PC help like Mac Geniuses, and a third caller wants to switch to Mac altogether. PC ignores these calls.
PC Innovations Lab—PC introduces himself and then starts talking about the PC Innovations Lab he has set up. When Mac questions him about it, he tells Mac that in response to the Mac's magnetic power cord, he wrapped another PC in bubble wrap, and in response to Mac's all-day battery life, he made an extremely long power cord. Mac tells PC that innovations should make people's lives easier, to which PC shows Mac another PC with cupholders on its shoulders. PC then takes the cup and says "Cheers to innovation!"
PC News—PC is sitting at a news desk and turns it over to a correspondent at what seems to be a launch party for Windows 7. A person being interviewed reveals that he is switching to a Mac. PC is surprised by this and asks why, but more people speak of how Mac is #1 with customer satisfaction until PC finally says to cut the feed. He then suggests going to commercial, but Mac acknowledges that they are in a commercial, so PC instead suggests going to another commercial.
Pep Rally—PC is introduced by a cheerleading squad. When asked, PC explains Mac's number-one status on college campuses with a built-in iSight camera, a stable operating system, and an ability to run Microsoft Office so well, so he wants to win students back with a pep rally. The cheerleaders cheer, "Mac's Number One!" and upon PC's complaint, they cheer, "PC's Number Two!"
Pizza Box—PC tries to attract college students by posing as a free box of pizza. This ad was aired during Apple's 2008 back-to-school promotion.
Podium—PC, in the style of a political candidate, is standing at a podium making declarations about Windows Vista, urging those who are having compatibility problems with existing hardware to simply replace them and to ignore the new features of Mac OS X Leopard. However, he privately admits to Mac that he himself has downgraded to Windows XP three weeks ago. His key slogan is: "It's not about what Vista can do for you; it's what you can buy for Vista."
PR Lady—Mac and PC are joined by a public relations representative (played by Mary Chris Wall), who has been hired by PC to place a positive spin on the reaction to Windows Vista and claims that many people are even downgrading back to Windows XP. Her response to claims that more people are switching to Mac instead is a sheepish "No comment."
Referee—A referee is present, according to PC, to make sure that Mac doesn't go on saying that Leopard is better and faster than Vista. When Mac defends himself, saying it was The Wall Street Journal that compared the two, PC complains, and the referee sides with Mac. Upon insulting the referee, PC is ejected, but PC rebuts, saying that he has nowhere to go (in the ad's area).
Restarting—Mac and PC explain how they both have a lot in common, but their discussion is hampered by PC's unfortunate habit of freezing and restarting.
Sabotage—PC is present, but a different actor (Robert Webb in UK version) appears in Mac's place, obviously reciting poorly memorized lines to flatter PC. The real Mac arrives soon after, and, while PC denies anything is happening, the impostor Mac tells the real Mac that he is a big fan of his.
Sad Song—PC sings a short country-and-Western-style song to express his grievances about people leaving PCs for Macs and Vista's technical issues. A hound-dog then howls, which Mac says is a "nice touch." A longer version ends with Mac asking PC if the dog is his, which it isn't.
Sales Pitch—Although Mac introduces himself, as usual, PC says, "And buy a PC." He explains that Mac's increasing popularity is forcing him to be more forward in his self-promotion, so he is reduced to holding up red signs depicting various pitches.
Santa Claus—Another animated Get a Mac commercial featuring Santa Claus and Christmas caroling by both PC and Mac. PC spoils the group's singing of "Santa Claus is Coming to Town" by inserting "Buy a PC and not a Mac this holiday season or any other time for goodness sake," and claims, "That's how I learned it." The animation style is similar to the Rankin/Bass television specials Rudolph the Red-Nosed Reindeer and Santa Claus Is Comin' to Town.
Security—In a reference to criticisms of Windows Vista's security features, PC is a joined by a tall United States Secret Service-style bodyguard (Patrick Warburton) who represents Vista's new security feature. The guard intrusively demands PC's decisions to cancel or allow every incoming or outgoing interaction he has with Mac.
Self Pity—Mac, for once, is wearing a suit. He explains that he "does work stuff, too," and has been running Microsoft Office for years. Upon hearing this, PC becomes despondent and collapses on the floor, begging to be left alone to depreciate.
Stuffed—PC enters slowly with a ballooned torso, explaining that all the trial software is slowing him down. Mac replies that Macs only come with the specific software for which customers ask (namely, the iLife package). As PC finally gets on his mark, Mac begins his intro again, but PC realizes that he has forgotten something and begins to slowly leave.
Stacks—PC is searching through all of his pictures, trying to find a photograph of his friend. He searches one picture at a time, but Mac states that iPhoto has a feature called Faces, in which iPhoto can tag the face of a person and find other pictures of the same person, putting them all into the same folder and saving search time. PC responds to the facial-recognition technology as expensive and tells Mac to sort the pictures instead because he has the technology to make it easier.
Surgery—PC appears in the garb of a patient awaiting surgery and explains that he is upgrading to Windows Vista but requires surgery to upgrade (specifically, upgrading such items as graphics cards, processors, memory, etc.). In reference to perceived difficulties in upgrading, PC admits that he is worried about going through it and bequeaths his peripherals to Mac should he not survive. Mac asks PC if, like him, his upgrade could be straightforward.
Surprise—Mac appears alongside a customer (Andrée Vermeulen) with PC notably absent. Mac tries to convince the customer, who wants to buy an effective computer, that she should get a PC, telling her that they're much better and more stable. The customer seems skeptical, tells Mac she will "think about it", and leaves. A frustrated Mac pulls off a mask and his clothes, revealing himself to be PC in disguise. The real Mac then appears, sees PC's discarded mask and clothes, and says, "I don't even want to ask."
Tech Support—A technician (Brian Huskey) is present to install a webcam on PC (using masking tape to attach it to his head). PC is extremely pleased by his new upgrade, but upon hearing from the technician that Mac has a built-in webcam, he storms off without waiting for the camera to be fully installed.
Teeter Tottering—A woman who had a PC has a box of things that were in her PC and says she's switching to Mac. PC tries to convince her to stay while she goes over to Mac every time.
Throne—PC appears in a king's robe and on a throne saying, even though switching computers can be difficult, his subjects won't leave him and that he's still the "king" of computers. Mac then begins talking about how PC's subjects can bring their PC into an Apple Store wherein all PC files can be transferred over to a new Mac, at which point PC declares Mac banished.
Time Machine—Mac appears with nine clones of himself behind him, who all introduce themselves at once. PC is shocked, so the various Macs explain that it is simply Time Machine, a feature in Leopard that makes regular backups of a user's hard drive. PC admits that he likes the feature, and the Mac clones thank him one at a time.
Time Traveler—PC uses a time machine to travel to the year 2150 to see if any major issues such as freezing and crashing have been removed from the PC and to see if PCs will eventually be as hassle-free as Macs are. Promptly after PC arrives in 2150, his future self freezes, which answers the question.
Top of the Line—PC and Mac appear with a customer who is looking for a new computer. PC introduces her to the "top-of-the-line" PC (Patrick Warburton), a handsome and overly slick PC in a suit. She asks him about screen size and speed, to which the top-of-the-line PC says he's the best. However, he balks when she says she doesn't want to deal with any viruses or hassle. She decides to go with Mac, so the top-of-the-line PC hands her his business card and tells her, "When you're ready to compromise...you call me."
Touché—Right after PC introduces himself, Mac replies, "And I'm a PC, too." Mac explains to the confused PC that he can run both Mac OS X and Microsoft Windows, calling himself "the only computer you'll ever need." PC mutters, "Oh...touché." Mac explains, referring to the rules of fencing, that one only says touché after he or she makes a point and someone else makes a counterpoint, but PC continues to misuse the word. A similar conversation occurred inDodgeball: A True Underdog Story, a film in which Justin Long (Mac) appeared.
Trainer—The commercial starts off traditionally, but PC is doing sit-ups with a trainer in a striped shirt (Robert Loggia), whose fierce coaching style discourages PC. PC suggests the trainer try some "positive reinforcement," but the trainer compliments Mac instead, and PC is offended. This is the first commercial to show the Mac OS X Snow Leopard.
Tree Trimming—In another animated Get a Mac commercial for the holiday season, Mac and PC set aside their disagreements and decide to trim a Christmas tree by hanging ornaments and stringing lights. Mac tells PC that they are good friends, while PC gets nervous. When they are finished, PC does not want to light the lights on the tree, but Mac persuades him to do so. PC plugs in the tree's lights, but, when illuminated, the lights spell: "PC RULES." He apologizes to Mac and says that it "just sort of happened."
Trust Mac—PC, in an attempt to hide from spyware, is wearing a trench coat, a fedora, dark glasses, and a false mustache. PC offers Mac a disguise, but Mac declines, saying he does not have to worry about the normal PC spyware and viruses with Mac OS X Leopard.
V Word—PC declares that people should to stop referring to his operating system (Vista) by name. He says using the word "doesn't sit well with frustrated PC users. From now on, we're going to use a word with a lot less baggage:'Windows.'" During the scene, he holds a black box with a large red button that sounds a buzzer when pressed. PC presses the button whenever Mac says Vista. After pointing out that not using the word isn't the same as fixing the operating system's problems, Mac ends the ad by saying Vista several times in rapid succession, thwarting PC's attempts to sound the buzzer.
Viruses—PC has caught a new virus (represented as a cold) and warns Mac to stay away from him, citing the 114,000 known viruses for PCs. Mac states the viruses that affect PCs do not affect him, and PC announces that he will crash before collapsing onto the floor in a faint.
Work vs. Home—Mac describes how he enjoys doing fun activities such as podcasts and movies, which leads PC to claim that he also does fun activities such as timesheets, spreadsheets, and pie charts. After Mac states that it's difficult to capture a family vacation using a pie chart, PC rebuts by showing a pie chart representing "hanging-out time" and "just kicking it" with different shades of gray. Mac replies, "I feel like I was there."
Wall Street Journal—Mac is reading a favorable review of himself by Walt Mossberg in The Wall Street Journal. Jealous, PC claims he also received a great review but is caught off-guard when Mac asks for specific details. This ad is currently not available on the Apple website but can be found on YouTube.
Yoga—Mac is watching PC have a yoga session in which the yoga instructor (Judy Greer) is coaching PC in expelling bad Vista energy and forgetting Vista's problems. When the yoga instructor goes on to complain that Vista caused errors in her yoga billing and then storms off, PC considers switching to pilates.

Web-exclusive campaign

Several advertisements have been shown exclusively in Flash ad campaigns running on numerous websites. Unlike the ads shown on television, these advertisements have not been posted as high-quality QuickTime videos on Apple's website. These ads run for approximately 20 seconds each and reference specific online advertising features (such as banner ads), making it unlikely they will ever appear on television.

The titles are taken from the Flash-video file names.
Banging—PC expresses his regret for upgrading to Windows Vista because it is causing him various problems. Mac tries to comfort him, but PC continues to bang his head on the side of the banner advertisement.
 Booby Trap— PC and Mac are at PCMag. PC is angry that they put up a banner ad saying that iLife '09 is the best office suite. PC hooks some cables up to the banner claiming that whoever clicks that will get shocked. PC proves it himself by clicking it.
 Claw—In a skyscraper ad, PC is using a grabber claw to try to grab a boxed copy of Microsoft Office 2008 for Mac that is sitting in the top banner ad. He claims that if people see that Office 08 is on the Mac, that they will ask questions regarding what a PC can do that the Mac can't. Mac points out that Office has been on the Mac for years, and that this is simply the latest version. PC knocks over the Office box, which causes an alarm to go off. PC hands the grabber claw to Mac, saying "He did it!"
 Cramped—In the only known UK web-exclusive ad, PC and Mac (portrayed by Mitchell and Webb) are lying head-to-head in a banner ad, complaining about the size and format of the banner ad, and encouraging the user to click the ad quicker.
 Customer Experience—A banner ad shows that Mac is rated #1 among customers experience. PC is frustrated and goes to more opinions from a before and after hair ad. Both say that the Mac is better.
 Customer Satisfaction—A "Mac Customer Satisfaction Score" meter appears in a banner ad above Mac and PC. The meter's needle is hovering at about 85 out of 100. PC excuses himself and climbs up to the upper banner ad, and pulls on the needle. He accidentally breaks off the tip of the meter, and then waves it at the 20 mark, saying "Customer satisfaction is dropping..."
Easy as 1–23—In a Web banner, PC shows Mac his new slogan. Mac assumes it means "PC. Easy as 1-2-3," but PC corrects him by stating it means "Easy as 1 through 23". He then pulls out 23 steps for using a PC.
 Editorial—PC drags his own op-ed column into the banner ad (since these ads appeared on news sites, such as cnn.com, it "blends" in with the rest of the site). The op-ed headline says "Stop Switching to Mac!" PC explains that people are switching to Macs more than ever, and that they need to know how much it is hurting PC. He makes a couple of anguished poses in the photo box to illustrate how frustrated he is.
Hiding—PC peeks in from the left side of the screen. When Mac asks what PC is doing, PC explains that he is hiding from viruses and spyware. PC then leaves, saying that he has to run a scan. There are two versions of this ad: a 300x250 square ad and a 160x600 vertical banner ad. PC is identical in both versions, but Mac's performance features a different take in each.
Knocking—PC panics about needing to search for new drivers for his hardware now that he's upgraded to Windows Vista. He tries to force his way off the left side of the screen so he can leave to find the new drivers but repeatedly runs into a wall. When he finally succeeds in breaking through the left side of the screen, he finds himself jumping back in from the right side of the screen.
 Newswire—PC, jealous of Mac's good press, gets his own newswire ticker above the ad. Unfortunately, the newswire displays unflattering headlines such as "Vista Users Upset Over Glitches" and "Users Downgrade to XP." PC says he hates his stupid newswire and then the next headline on the newswire is "PC Hates His Stupid Newswire."
Not—A banner ad on the top of the page reads, "Leopard is better and faster than Vista." —Wall Street Journal. On the side, Mac introduces himself while PC climbs a ladder. Mac asks what PC is doing and he says that he is fixing an embarrassing typo. He then climbs all the way to the top and staples a piece of paper that says NOT at the end of the quotation. He then tells Mac that they have the whole Internet to correct and asks Mac to grab the ladder.
PC Turf (PCMag and PCWorld exclusive)—PC welcomes Web surfers to his turf, PCWorld.com, and remarks that Mac must feel out of place there. Mac points out that they said some great things about Macs, so PC asks security to remove Mac because he's going to be a problem. The PCMag version is identical, except PC's voice is re-dubbed to say "PCMag.com."
 Refresh—A banner ad on the top of the page reads, "Vista...one of the biggest blunders in technology?" —CNET.com. Off to the side, PC sees the banner and realizes its another bad review of Vista and decides to do an emergency refresh. He walks over and opens a compartment door that says, "Emergency Banner Refresh." PC flips the switch, and the banner is replaced by another banner that reads, "It's time for a Vista do-over" —PC Magazine. PC, frustrated about this review, flips the switch again. The banner is replaced by another that reads, "Mac OS X Leopard: A Perfect 10" —InfoWorld. PC sees this positive review and is relieved until he realizes it's about Leopard. PC angrily flips the switch again to end the ad.
Sign—In a skyscraper ad, Mac asks PC about an unlit sign in a separate banner ad that reads, "DON'T GIVE UP ON VISTA." PC replies that it will stop the problem of frustrated Windows Vista users downgrading to XP or switching to Macs. He presses a button, lighting up only the GIVE UP part of the sign. He presses it again, lighting up ON VISTA. Frustrated, PC presses the button repeatedly, causing GIVE UP and ON VISTA to light up alternately.
 Switcher Cams—A banner ad at the top of the page displays a bank of 5 security camera screens which show users walking into Apple Stores; as users walk past each camera "PC SWITCHER" lights up in red beneath each screen. On the side, PC sees the switchers and is disappointed they are upgrading to Mac instead of to Windows 7. Mac says he thought Windows 7 was "supposed to be an improvement", to which PC responds that Macs are still #1 in customer satisfaction and that people will have to move their files over anyway. Still observing the switchers, PC leaves the side and appears on one of the video screens, managing to stop one switcher from going into the Apple Store but says there are still "thousands and thousands to go".

UK campaign

For the British market, the ads were recast with the popular British comedy double act Mitchell and Webb in the lead roles; David Mitchell as PC and Robert Webb as Mac. As well as original ads, several ads from the American campaign were reshot with new dialogue and slightly altered scenes. These ads are about 40 seconds long, which is slightly longer than the US advertisements.

The following ads are exclusive to the UK:
Art Language—In an effort to relate to the creative artistic types whom he assumes own Macs, PC, dressed in a stereotypically bohemian fashion, begins speaking to Mac using unnecessarily pretentious language. Despite Mac's insistence that he enables anyone to be creative, PC continues using big words, eventually confusing even himself.
Court—PC, dressed in a barrister's outfit, questions Mac on how long it takes to make an iPhoto photo book that Mac claims to have made in a few minutes. Doubting Mac's claim, PC eventually resorts to cutting off Mac whenever he tries to speak.
Magic—Exchanging an average 50k Word document in a file to Mac, PC makes out that the process is much harder than it actually is through the use of a drum roll and a magician's assistant, and shouting "Amazing!" at the end of the transfer. Bemused, Mac points out that he is compatible with PC and effortlessly passes him back a photo, at the end of which PC shouts "Amazing!".
Naughty Step—PC unveils his naughty step: the ultimate deterrent to an unruly errant child (similar to the technique used by Jo Frost in the UK and US series Supernanny). He goes on to explain that children should not be making pictures, movies, and websites on a "proper, grown-up PC". Mac points out that these are activities children like to do, resulting in his own banishment to the naughty step.
 Office at Home—PC is proud of his role in both the office and the home, but Mac retaliates by stating that homes are not run like offices, and thus shouldn't have office computers. PC eagerly begins to describe the ways in which homes can be run like offices, with his increasing authoritarianism prompting Mac to sarcastically comment that PC's home "sounds like a fun place".
Office Posse—PC wonders why Microsoft Office (Excel, PowerPoint, Word and Entourage) are standing with Mac and is surprised when Mac says that he runs Office also. PC attempts to order and then entice the Office members to join him, but they refuse, resulting in what Mac calls an awkward moment.
 Tentacle—PC praises Britain's work ethic, chastising Mac's insistence on the need for fun in life. In attempting to persuade Mac of his point of view, PC employs the use of several animal metaphors, but becomes sidetracked through his increasingly eager musing about the practical applications of octopus tentacles in an office.

Several American ads were modified for the UK market. In some of these ads, the events that occur in the narrative differ significantly from the original American campaign. Others follow the original ads more closely, with only minor differences (many based on the differences in characterization from the actors involved or language differences between American English and British English). These ads are also performed by Mitchell and Webb.

The adapted ads are
Accident—The ad follows the same narrative, with a different ending: PC, on heavy pain medication, requests to be pushed over to the window so he can look at the pigeons, only for Mac to point out that there are no pigeons nor a window. PC responds with a dreamy "You're funny...".
Network—The ad follows the same narrative, but in the British version Mac connects with a Japanese printer instead of a digital camera. PC is also more involved in the dialogue, attempting to communicate in Japanese with the printer, only to mangle his words, first declaring that he is a rice cake before asking, "Where is the train station?". This larger involvement of PC, when compared to PC in the American ad, is also shown by the appearance of subtitles whenever PC, Mac, or the printer speak in Japanese; in the American ad, there are no subtitles translating Mac and the camera's dialogue, further evidencing that PC is lost in the conversation.
Out of the Box—The ad is almost exactly the same as the American version. However, Mac doesn't mention his built-in camera. Also, at the end, PC pulls out an extremely thick user manual and starts reading it.
Pie Chart—The ad is based on the American Work vs. Home. The light-grey area of PC's family holiday pie chart now represents "shenanigans and tomfoolery" and the dark-grey area represents "hijinks". Also, PC further divides hijinks into "capers", "monkey business", and "just larking about".
 Restarting—The ad follows much the same narrative as the American ad, with the only major difference being that, after Mac has left to get someone from IT, PC awakens and wonders where everyone has gone.
 Stuffed—This ad contains no significant changes from the American version.
 Trust Mac—The ad follows the same narrative as the American version, but at the end, PC yells out that there is nobody present but two Macs having fun.
 Virus—Based on the American ad Viruses, it contains the dialogue "This one's a humdinger" instead of "a doozy" but otherwise contains no significant changes.

Japanese campaign

On December 12, 2006, Apple began to release ads in Japan that were similar in style to the US Get a Mac ads. The Mac and PC are played by the Rahmens, a Japanese comedy duo. The ads used to be viewable at Apple's Japan website.

The following ads are exclusive to Japan:
Nengajo—Mac shows PC the New Year's Card he made using iPhoto. PC then looks at it, remarking about the picture of the wild boar on the card.
Nicknames—PC is confused as to why Mac is not called a PC. Mac then explains that more people use him at home, and PC counters that he is more business-oriented. PC then asks for a nickname for himself; Mac then names him Wāku (work).
Practice Drawing—PC says he can create pictures, but they are all graphs. For example, what Mac thinks is Manhattan is a bar graph and what Mac thinks is a mountain view is a line graph. Mac catches on, correctly identifying a pie chart, but PC responds that it is a pizza, chiding Mac for having no artistic sense. This is similar to Art Language, in that PC is trying to connect with artsy people like Mac.
Steps—Mac tells PC that he has made his own webpage using iWeb. PC then asks for the steps to make his own. Mac gives them, finishing after step three. PC then pesters Mac for step four, which Mac finally explains is to have a cup of coffee.

Several American ads were modified for the Japanese market. In some of these ads, the events that occur in the narrative differ significantly from the original American campaign. Others follow the original ads more closely, with only minor differences (many based on the differences in characterization from the actors involved).

The adapted ads are
 Bloated—This ad is similar to Stuffed, but in this ad, PC makes no reference to bloatware (limited or useless versions of programs loaded onto new PCs), instead complaining about how much space installing a new operating system takes. Mac expresses his hopes that PC didn't have to delete any important data.
 iLife—This ad is almost exactly the same as the American version, except that PC is listening to Eurobeat on his iPod rather than slow jams, and Mac gives a pregnant pause instead of complimenting PC on his pre-loaded calculator and clock.
 iMovie—This ad with Miki Nakatani, is nearly identical to the American ad Better Results, except that PC actually thinks that his home movie is comparable to the Mac home movie.
 Microsoft Office—Based on the UK ad Office Posse, the ad contains only minor differences. At the end of the ad, PC tries to entice Office by chanting, "Overtime! Overtime! All together now!"
 Pie Chart—This ad is based on the American ad Work vs. Home. The narrative is largely the same, with the only significant differences being that Mac is blogging rather than working with movies, music, and podcasts, and the names of the divisions of the pie chart each represent Sightseeing and Relaxing at a Café.
 Restart—This ad is identical to the American ad Restarting, except that PC doesn't restart again after Mac goes off to get IT.
 Security—This ad is based on the American ad Trust Mac, but contains some significant changes. Rather than disguising himself to hide from viruses, PC dons protective gear to fight viruses. PC demands that any virus out there come and fight him. After Mac points out a virus, PC slowly moves behind Mac to protect himself.
 Virus—The ad contains no significant changes from the American ad Viruses.

Keynote videos

While not strictly a part of the ad campaign, Hodgman and Long appeared in videos during Steve Jobs's keynote addresses at the 2006, 2007, and 2009 Worldwide Developers Conference and the 2008 MacWorld Expo. Hodgman alone appeared in the November 2020 Apple Event.
 WWDC 2006—In an attempt to stall Mac development, PC claims to have a message from Steve Jobs that says that the developers should take the rest of the year off, and that Microsoft could use some help with Vista. He starts to go off-topic about his vacation with Jobs, but when Mac arrives he says he's just preparing for their next commercial and starts to sing the Meow Mix theme song off-key.
 WWDC 2007—PC dresses up as Steve Jobs, and announces that he is quitting and shutting down Apple. He claims that Vista did so well, selling tens of dozens of copies, that there's no need for Leopard, and that he got his iPod-killer, a brown Zune. He tells the developers to just go home because they're no longer needed. Mac arrives and chides PC for trying to mislead the developers again like last year. He asks if PC really thinks the audience will believe he is Jobs. PC then claims he is Phil Schiller.
 MacWorld Expo 2008—PC and Mac stand under a Happy New Year sign, and PC talks about what a terrible year 2007 has been for him, referring to Windows Vista as a failure while Apple Inc. experienced success with Mac OS X Leopard, iPod Touch, and iPhone. Despite this, PC says he is optimistic for the future, claiming it to be the Year of the PC. When asked what his plans are for 2008, PC states he is "just going to copy everything [Mac] did in 2007."
 WWDC 2009—PC comes out and greets the crowd and says that he wants them to have a great conference with "incredible innovations that will keep Apple at the forefront..." He stops, then says, "I think I can do that better." Now it's take 2. He wishes them a "week with some innovation, but not a lot, please. Yeah, I like that." Then he says some stuff about the 1 Billion App Countdown. He asks for apps and ideas. He says, "I hope you're thinking of some great ideas because I'm thinking of some great ideas too!...What are your ideas?" Eventually at Take 16, PC gives up and Mac tells everyone to have a great conference.
 Apple Event November 2020—PC criticizes the upgrades made to the MacBook Air earlier in the event.

Effectiveness
Before the campaign's launch, Apple had seen lower sales in 2005–06. One month after the start of the "Get a Mac" campaign, Apple saw an increase of 200,000 Macs sold, and at the end of July 2006, Apple announced that it had sold 1.3 million Macs. Apple had an overall increase in sales of 39% for the fiscal year ending September 2006.

Criticism

In an article for Slate magazine, Seth Stevenson criticized the campaign as being too "mean spirited", suggesting, "isn't smug superiority (no matter how affable and casually dressed) a bit off-putting as a brand strategy?".

Writing in The Guardian, Charlie Brooker criticized the casting of comedians Mitchell and Webb in the UK campaign, noting that in the sitcom they were then starring in together, Peep Show, "Mitchell plays a repressed, neurotic underdog, and Webb plays a selfish, self-regarding poseur... So when you see the ads, you think, 'PCs are a bit rubbish yet ultimately lovable, whereas Macs are just smug, preening tossers.'"

PC Magazine Editor in Chief Lance Ulanoff criticized the campaign's use of the term "PC" to refer specifically to IBM PC compatible, or Wintel, computers, noting that this usage, though common, is incorrect, as the Macintosh is also a personal computer. In a 2008 column, he recommended that the characters instead introduce themselves as "a Mac PC" and "a Windows PC", adding, "Of course, the ads would then be far less effective, because consumers might realize that the differences Apple is trying to tout aren't quite as huge as Apple would like you to believe."

I'm a PC

Microsoft responded to the Get a Mac advertising campaign in late 2008 by releasing the I'm a PC campaign, featuring Microsoft employee Sean Siler as a John Hodgman look-alike. While Apple's ads show personifications of both Mac and PC systems, the Microsoft ads show PC users instead proudly defining themselves as PCs.

Justin Gets Real

In the wake of the Mac transition to Apple silicon, in March 2021, Intel made a similar advertising campaign, known as Justin Gets Real, featuring Justin Long as himself promoting Intel PCs over Macs. These commercials typically start with Long stating, "Hello, I'm a..." against the familiar minimalist background before he suddenly says, "Justin, just a real person doing a real comparison between Mac and PC.".

In popular culture/parodies

 Videos parodying the Get a Mac campaign have been published online by Novell, to promote Linux, represented by a young and fashionable woman. A different set of videos parodying the campaign have been produced, but with Linux portrayed as a typical male nerd.
 To promote Steam on Mac, Valve made a parody with Portal and Team Fortress 2 sentry guns.
 After the 2007–2008 Writers Guild of America strike, the cast and crew of the American television show Numb3rs decided to parody the "Get a Mac" commercials to promote the return of the show on Friday, April 4, 2008. In the ad, brothers Don Eppes (Rob Morrow) and Dr. Charlie Eppes (David Krumholtz) debate the merits of being an FBI agent versus being a mathematician. The cast and crew used two hours of production time to film the 34-second ad.
 The Get a Mac campaign became the basis for the long running YouTube series Hi, I'm a Marvel...and I'm a DC by ItsJustSomeRandomGuy. The series took the classic superhero characters from Marvel Comics and DC Comics and compared their film adaptations. In this case Marvel was constantly touted as being superior due to having more successful film adaptations of their characters than DC who have notoriously not only have had fewer adaptations, but also many of them being critically or commercially panned.
 Late Show with David Letterman made parodies of the Get a Mac campaign, from Mac's wig being taken off by PC to reveal baldness, to Mac as David Hasselhoff eating a cheeseburger drunk.
 In the Comedy World theme of the website GoAnimate, there is two characters modeled after the main characters.
 On an episode of Air Farce Live, aired around the time of the Canadian federal election, had a sketch where one of the comedians was introduced as a Liberal, and the other as a PC (Progressive Conservative Party of Canada). The sketch was split into separate parts during the episode.
 City of Heroes offered a series of online video parodies with a commercial featuring dialog centered around two machinima characters. They all start the same: one proclaiming "I'm a hero" and the other proclaiming "I'm a villain." The video was made to promote their new Mac edition of the game for OS X computers, released in February 2009.
 Instant Star and Degrassi: The Next Generation were in a parody where they would describe their own shows. Alexz Johnson portrayed Instant Star (Johnson portrays Jude Harrison in the show) and Miriam McDonald portrayed Degrassi (McDonald portrays Emma Nelson in the show).
 SuperNews! made 2 shorts based on the "Get a Mac" ads, which features Bill Gates and Steve Jobs fighting each other. Before all videos were removed from Current's YouTube Channel by Al Jazeera Media Network, the first one was the highest viewed video in said channel with over 3,000,000 views.
 A Funny or Die promo video for the release of John Hodgman's book That Is All includes a segment in which Hodgman walks through a 'void' room in his deranged millionaire mansion. Justin Long sits alone in the white open space from the Get A Mac ads, happy to see Hodgman again and eager to make another commercial.
 T-Mobile also created their own version in 2011 featuring Carly Foulkes. The advertisements followed the same structure as the Mac ads, but comparing T-Mobile to AT&T.

See also
Apple Switch ad campaign
Apple evangelist
Cola Wars
Comparative advertising
Apple Inc. advertising

References

Apple Inc. advertising
American television commercials
Advertising campaigns
2006 introductions
American advertising slogans
2006 neologisms
2000s television commercials